Level 0 may refer to:

 Level 0, the lowest level of automation in a self-driving automobile
 Level 0 Modules, genetic elements in Golden Gate Cloning
 Level 0 coronavirus restrictions, see COVID-19 pandemic in Scotland#Levels System